The 1916 Syracuse Orangemen football team represented Syracuse University as an independent during the 1916 college football season. Led by Bill Hollenback in his first and only season as head coach, the Orangemen compiled a record of 5–4.

Schedule

References

Syracuse
Syracuse Orange football seasons
Syracuse Orangemen football